On 9 August 2013, four gunmen opened fire at a mosque in Quetta, Pakistan while people were exiting the mosque. As a result, at least ten people were killed and thirty more people were injured. It is suspected that the target in the shooting was former Pakistan Peoples Party minister Ali Madad Jatak. This shooting occurred during the time when many Pakistani citizens were celebrating Eid al-Fitr.

See also

 Terrorist incidents in Pakistan in 2013

References

2013 murders in Pakistan
21st-century mass murder in Pakistan
Terrorist incidents in Pakistan in 2013
Terrorist incidents in Quetta
Mass shootings in Pakistan
Mass murder in 2013
2013 mass shootings in Asia